Killington is a village and civil parish in the South Lakeland district of the county of Cumbria, England.  It had a population of 152 in 2001, At the 2011 census Killington was grouped with Firbank giving a total population of 261.

Killington gives its name to Killington Lake, after which Killington Lake services is named, although this is located in the neighbouring parish of New Hutton.

Killington Hall, in the centre of the village, dates largely from c. 1640, was altered in 1803, and preserves the ruins of a 15th-century pele tower adjoining the main building.  The Hall is adjacent to All Saints' Church, which dates from the 14th century, with 17th-century alterations, and was originally built as the chapel to the Hall.

See also

Listed buildings in Killington, Cumbria

References

External links

 Cumbria County History Trust: Killington (nb: provisional research only – see Talk page)
Visit Cumbria: All Saints Church
Visit Cumbria: Killington Hall

Villages in Cumbria
Civil parishes in Cumbria
South Lakeland District